Radu Albot and Denys Molchanov won the title, defeating Alessandro Motti and Simone Vagnozzi 6–0, 6–2 in the final.

Seeds

  Alessandro Motti /  Simone Vagnozzi (final)
  Radu Albot /  Denys Molchanov (champions)
  Gerard Granollers /  Guillermo Olaso (first round)
  Dušan Lajović /  Javier Martí (semifinals)

Draw

Draw

References
 Main Draw

Mersin Cup - Doubles
2012 Doubles